Sea Monsters: A Prehistoric Adventure (also called Sea Monsters) is a 2007 American IMAX 3D documentary film by National Geographic, about prehistoric marine reptiles. It alternates modern-day sequences about the work of scientists studying the animals with computer-animated scenes depicting the prehistoric past.

Sea Monsters was well received by critics. The tie-in video game, however, was panned.

Plot 
Brings to life some of the most bizarre, ferocious and fascinating creatures to ever inhabit the ocean. Combines animation with recreations in a prehistoric adventure. A journey to the bottom of the ancient oceans dramatizes awe-inspiring creatures.

Prehistory segments
The protagonist of the story is Dolly, a female Dolichorhynchops who travels the Kansas Inland Sea with her family, 80 million years ago during the late Cretaceous period.

They encounter various creatures, including, Tylosaurus, Xiphactinus, Cretoxyrhina, and Ammonites.

Dolly gets attacked by a shark (Squalicorax) after her mother was killed by another shark (Cretoxyrhina). Dolly survives due to a passing Tylosaurus killing the shark, albeit with a tooth embedded in her flipper. Later, Dolly's brother is swallowed whole by a young Tylosaurus, who in turn is killed by a larger member of its kind, leaving Dolly alone. Dolly survives to adulthood and goes on to have young of her very own. After seasons of traveling around the Inland sea, Dolly finally dies peacefully of old age.

Live-action segments 
 South Australia, 2002: Two paleontologists in the Australian Outback discovered Dolichorhynchops, 95% of them juveniles.
 Central Texas, 1980: A road crew near Austin, Texas, discover ammonite fossils in a quarry. During the Cretaceous, Texas was underwater and the quarry was part of the Permian Basin.
 Western Kansas, 1918: Charles Sternberg and his sons Levi and George discover a 29-foot-long Tylosaurus that had a Dolichorhynchops in it.
 Phosphate Mine, Negev Desert, Israel, 1998: A quarry in Europe reveals a mosasaur skull.
 Western Kansas, 1952: George Sternberg, Charles's older son, makes a discovery in Gove County, Kansas. A 13-foot-long Xiphactinus containing, below the ribs, a 6-foot-long fish, a Gillicus, which took up about half of the length of the Xiphactinus, killing it instantly.
 North Dakota, 1995: Two amateur collectors go into a cave in North Dakota, and find a wealth of teeth from sharks, specifically Cretoxyrhina and Squalicorax.
 The Netherlands, 1998: A Dutch quarry reveals a mosasaur skeleton with bite marks from sharks.
 South Dakota, 1978: The Badlands National Park, in Rapid City, South Dakota, reveals a Tylosaurus skeleton that had eaten multiple creatures in one meal.

Creatures featured 
 Ammonite
 Baculite (identified as "straight-shelled ammonites")
 Bananogmius, an extinct genus of bony fish
 Caproberyx, an extinct genus of bony fish
 Cretoxyrhina, a large shark
 Dolichorhynchops (often shortened to "dollies" in the story), a genus of plesiosaur and the main animal in the film.
 Enchodus, an extinct genus of bony fish
 Gillicus, a relatively small, 2-meter long ichthyodectid fish
 Gorgosaurus, a genus of tyrannosaurid theropod dinosaur
 Henodus (cameo), a placodont with an elaborate shell of the Late Triassic period
 Hesperornis, an extinct genus of flightless aquatic birds
 Inoceramus, an extinct genus of giant clam
 Jellyfish (live-acted)
 Kronosaurus (cameo), an extinct genus of short-necked pliosaur
 Leptecodon, a genus of prehistoric fish
 Nothosaurus (cameo), an extinct genus of sauropterygian reptile
 Platecarpus, an extinct genus of aquatic lizard belonging to the mosasaur family
 Protosphyraena, a fossil genus of swordfish-like marine fish
 Protostega, an extinct species of marine turtle
 Pteranodon, one of the largest pterosaur genera
 Squalicorax, a genus of extinct lamniform shark
 Styxosaurus, a genus of plesiosaur of the family Elasmosauridae
 Temnodontosaurus (cameo), a big ichthyosaur 
 Tusoteuthis, a genus of Cretaceous cephalopod molluscs
 Tylosaurus, a giant mosasaur
 Uintacrinus (identified as "crinoid"), a floating colonial crinoid

Soundtrack 
The film's ambient soundtrack was composed by Richard Evans. David Rhodes and Peter Gabriel performed the end credits song "Different Stories Different Lives". The soundtrack has never been officially released.

Release 
The film was released on October 5, 2007. It was promoted with a line of toys from Wild Republic. It won the "Outstanding Visual Effects in a Special Venue Project" award at the Visual Effects Society Awards 2007.

Reception 
The film earned a 100% "Fresh" rating from 12 positive reviews on Rotten Tomatoes. John Anderson of Variety wrote "the science seems sound and the story is exciting", and found it superior to 3D films that merely use the extra dimension as a gimmick. Matt Seitz of The New York Times was impressed by the digital spectacle. The Seattle Times, Orlando Sentinel and Chicago Tribune were of much the same mind.

Video game 
Sea Monsters: A Prehistoric Adventure was made into a game by DSI Games and published by Zoo Digital Publishing. It was released on the Wii, PlayStation 2, and Nintendo DS on October 25, 2007. Players can control Thalassomedon, Henodus, Temnodontosaurus, Tylosaurus, Dolichorhynchops and Nothosaurus in an open-world setting, with no fixed goal besides collecting all the hidden fossils.

The game received poor reviews across all platforms. Cheat Code Central's Amanda L. Kondolojy found the Wii version of the game conceptually interesting, but marred by poor execution, especially in terms of controls.

See also 
 Walking with Dinosaurs
 Sea Monsters (TV series)
 Walking with Monsters

References

External links 
 
 
 
 

Plesiosaurs in fiction
2007 films
IMAX short films
Documentary films about prehistoric life
Prehistoric life in popular culture
Films scored by Peter Gabriel
3D short films
National Geographic Society films
IMAX documentary films
3D documentary films
Films about dinosaurs
Documentary films about dinosaurs
2000s English-language films
2000s American films